The Clear Lake Volcanic Field is a volcanic field beside Clear Lake in California's northern Coast Ranges. The site of late-Pliocene to early Holocene activity, the volcanic field consists of lava domes, cinder cones, and maars with eruptive products varying from basalt to rhyolite. The site's threat level is ranked "High" at #33 in the top volcanic threats in the United States according to "2018 Update to the U.S. Geological Survey National Volcanic Threat Assessment". The last eruption being about 11,000 years ago.

The field's magma chamber also powers a geothermal field called The Geysers, which hosts the largest complex of geothermal power plants in the world. These can generate approximately 2000 megawatts, enough to power two cities the size of San Francisco.

The Clear Lake volcanics are thought to have been the heat source for the hot springs and hydrothermal activity that formed the mercury ores at the Sulphur Bank Mine, and the gold ore at the McLaughlin Mine.

References

External links
USGS.gov:  Clear Lake Volcanic Field, California — California Volcano Observatory.
Geysers.com:  The Geysers 

Volcanic fields of California
Landforms of Lake County, California
Maars of California
Natural history of the California Coast Ranges
Quaternary California
Quaternary volcanoes